Spirit Of The Andes is a Buckinghamshire-based mail order company, and retailer specializing in alpaca knitwear, Pima cotton clothing and accessories. It is owned by The Cashmere Centre Ltd. who also own The Pearl Company, Tesoro By Design and James Alexander Clothing.

The company works with clothes designers and knitters in South America to sell their products to the United Kingdom and worldwide.

History
The business was founded in 1993 and was based in Nether Burrow in Lancashire, United Kingdom. The retailer had shops around the country:
 
Alresford in Hampshire
Amersham in Buckinghamshire
Bakewell in Derbyshire
Bath in Somerset
Broadway in Worcestershire
Edinburgh in Lothian
Farnham in Surrey
Hay-on-Wye in Herefordshire
Holt in Norfolk
Hornby in Lancashire
Lavenham in Suffolk
Ludlow in Shropshire
Oakham in Rutland
Prestbury in Cheshire
Sherborne in Dorset

On 20 July 2015 the company went into administration with 62 people losing their jobs. The brand was bought by Richard Hartley, owner of alpaca and Pima cotton clothing retailer The Alpaca Collection, based in Stratford-upon-Avon.

Hartley reopened Spirit Of The Andes shops in Bakewell, Holt and Hornby  as well as selling from The Alpaca Collection's headquarters in Stratford-upon-Avon.

The company also had concession shops at House Of Marbles in Bovey Tracey, Devon; the Jinney Ring Craft Centre in Hanbury, Worcestershire, County Classics in Helmsley and Malton, North Yorkshire, and Asarti in Leiden, the Netherlands.

Current

In 2018 Spirit of the Andes was bought by The Cashmere Centre Ltd. due to Richard Hartley retiring. The company continues to sell online and by telephone, producing a brochure twice a year for its Spring/Summer and Autumn/Winter Alpaca and Pima Cotton clothing collections. It has a single retail shop unit based next to the company offices located between Buckingham and Milton Keynes.

References

Clothing retailers of the United Kingdom
Retail companies of England
Companies based in Stratford-upon-Avon
1993 establishments in England
English brands
British brands
Clothing brands of the United Kingdom
Companies that have entered administration in the United Kingdom